Amit Pachhara (born 8 September 1995) is an Indian cricketer who plays for Services. He made his first-class debut on 15 November 2015 in the 2015–16 Ranji Trophy. He made his List A debut on 17 December 2015 in the 2015–16 Vijay Hazare Trophy. He made his Twenty20 debut for Services in the 2016–17 Inter State Twenty-20 Tournament on 29 January 2017.

References

External links
 

1995 births
Living people
Indian cricketers
Services cricketers
People from Mathura